John Thomas Marshall (born January 6, 1931) is an American former basketball player and coach. He graduated from Mount Juliet High School in Mt. Juliet, Tennessee. He was a star at Western Kentucky University in the 1950s, where he was a two-time All-American. His number 41 is one of only six retired at Western Kentucky.  He was named to the OVC Half-Century Team and the OVC 40th Anniversary team. A 6'4" forward, he was drafted by the Rochester Royals with the seventh pick of the 1954 NBA draft.  After a promising rookie season, he was drafted into the Army and missed the 1955–56 season. In a four-year NBA career, he played for the Royals (in both Rochester and Cincinnati), as well as for the Detroit Pistons.  In his final year as a player (1958–59) he served as a player-coach; then coached the Cincinnati Royals for one additional season (1959–60) after retiring from playing. The Royals would eventually become the Sacramento Kings many years after his retirement.

References

External links
 Basketball-Reference.com: Tom Marshall (as player)
 Basketball-Reference.com: Tom Marshall (as coach)

1931 births
Living people
All-American college men's basketball players
American men's basketball coaches
American men's basketball players
Basketball coaches from Tennessee
Basketball players from Tennessee
Cincinnati Royals head coaches
Detroit Pistons players
People from Mount Juliet, Tennessee
Player-coaches
Rochester Royals draft picks
Rochester Royals players
Shooting guards
Small forwards
Western Kentucky Hilltoppers basketball players